Click of death is a term that had become common in the late 1990s referring to the clicking sound in disk storage systems that signals a disk drive has failed, often catastrophically.

The clicking sound itself arises from the unexpected movement of the disk's read/write actuator. At startup, and during use, the disk head must move correctly and be able to confirm that it is correctly tracking data on the disk. If the head fails to move as expected or upon moving cannot track the disk surface correctly, the disk controller may attempt to recover from the error by returning the head to its home position and then retrying, at times causing an audible "click". In some devices, the process automatically retries, causing a repeated or rhythmic clicking sound, sometimes accompanied by the whirring sound of the drive plate spinning.

Origin of the term 
The phrase "click of death" originated to describe a failure mode of the Iomega ZIP drives, appearing in print as early as January 30, 1998. In his podcast of September 18, 2008, Mac journalist Tim Robertson claimed to have coined the phrase in the early 1990s.

Iomega Zip drives 

Iomega Zip drives were prone to developing misaligned heads. 
Iomega received thousands of complaints about the click of death. Iomega stated that fewer than 1 in 200 Jaz and Zip drive owners were affected by the click of death. A class-action suit (Rinaldi v. Iomega Corp., 41 U.C.C. Rep. Serv. 2d 1143) was filed against them for violation of the Delaware Consumer Fraud Act in September 1998.

Hard disk drives 

On a hard disk drive, the click of death refers to a similar failure mode; the head actuator may click or knock as the drive repetitively tries to recover from one or more errors. These sounds can be heard as the heads load or unload, or they can be the sounds of the actuator striking a stop, or both.

See also 

 Head crash

References

External links 
 Comprehensive account of the click of death at grc.com
 Collection of noises made by failing hard drives at datacent.com
 Zip Disk Click of Death at youtube.com

Rotating disc computer storage media
Technological failures